Mirrie Irma Hill (née Solomon)  (1 December 18891 May 1986) was an Australian composer.

Early life 
Mirrie Irma Jaffa Hill was born on 1 December 1889 in the Sydney suburb of Randwick. She was the youngest of three, born to Levien Jaffa Solomon and Kate Caroline. She had a good ear early on, detecting dissonance and running out of the room whenever her aunt would play Mendelssohn's Songs Without Words. She studied composition with Alfred Hill, who would later become her husband, at Shirley School, Edgecliff.

With Alfred Hill as conductor, Godfrey Smith and the Sydney Amateur Orchestral Society performed Mirrie Hill's first orchestral work, Rhapsody for Piano and Orchestra, in 1914 at the Sydney Town Hall. She was unable to study in Germany because of World War I, so she instead went to the New South Wales State Conservatorium of Music, where she was awarded a scholarship by the director, Henri Verbrugghen.

Career
After finishing her schooling at the Conservatorium in 1918, Hill was made assistant-professor of harmony, counterpoint and composition there. After retiring from the Conservatorium in 1944, Hill worked as an examiner for the Australian Music Examinations Board from 1959 to 1966. Hill's exploration into music inspired by the indigenous peoples of Australia started when anthropologist Charles P. Mountford asked her to compose the score for the film he was making about Aboriginal life. For inspiration, Mountford gave Hill recordings he had made of performances of indigenous Australian songs. Hill drew from these recordings for both her suite Three Aboriginal Dances and Arnhem Land Symphony. Although the indigenous songs influenced Hill's Symphony, she has explained that the symphony was not meant to be specifically Aboriginal in its make-up.

Mirrie Hill described her own music as "not [in] the very modern idiom but entirely individual as to style and content." She composed in many different genres, but her favourite was classical orchestral music. She created over five hundred pieces, ranging from chamber music and film scores to elementary works for children. Although she did create many longer pieces of music for orchestra and ensembles, Hill became known as a miniaturist because a great deal of her published works were short.

Personal life 
In 1921, she married her previous teacher, Alfred Hill, who had three children from a previous marriage. She never had any children of her own. They were married in the Sydney suburb of Mosman, and built a home there, where they lived for most of their lives. Due to the fact that Alfred Hill was such a recognized composer, Mirrie Hill's work was often overlooked. She was described by the people around her as a shy and happy person; she put her husband's career before her own for most of her life. She received greater recognition for her works after her husband's death. In 1975 she was made a life member of the Fellowship of Australian Composers and in 1980 was appointed an OBE (Officer of the Most Excellent Order of the British Empire).

Works
Hill composed pieces for orchestra and chamber ensembles, as well as choral pieces, film scores, songs and solo instrumental works. She often incorporated Aboriginal themes and traditional Jewish melodies. Selected works include:
 Rhapsody for Piano and Orchestra (1914)
 The Leafy Lanes of Kent (1950)
 Three Miniature Pieces for the Piano
 Three Aboriginal Dances (Brolga, The Kunkarankara Women, Nalda of the Echo) (1950)
 Arnhem Land symphony (1954)
Her works have been recorded and issued on CD, including:
 Dance of the Wild MenEarly 20th Century Australian Piano Music Artworks
Additional works include:
 Meditation (1954)
 March of a Robot (1973)
 Dance of the Cunning Mouse (1973)
 My Bird Sings (1973)
 Merry Imp (1976)
 Come Summer (1969)
 Three Nice Mice (1970)
 Pipe Reel (1970)
 Child Fantasies (1935)
 Garden Sketches (1934)
 Mr. Roo (1948)
 Bell Birds (1952)
 The Dancing Fawn (1969)
 Party Tunes (1957)
 All In a Day (1950)
 Three Highland Tunes (1971)
 Dancing Feet (1950)
 Willow Wind (1973)
 Lost- my little black puppy: he scampers away (1949)
 For Hire (1949)
 Dreams (1942)
 Waltz (1942)

See also 
 Alfred Hill (composer)
 List of Australian women composers

References

Further reading 

1889 births
1986 deaths
20th-century classical composers
Australian music educators
Jewish classical composers
Australian women classical composers
Australian Jews
Musicians from Sydney
University of Sydney alumni
Academic staff of the Sydney Conservatorium of Music
Australian classical composers
Hill-McIndoe-Gillies family
Women music educators
Australian Officers of the Order of the British Empire
20th-century women composers